Ocie Elliott is a Canadian folk music duo from Victoria, British Columbia, whose members are Jon Middleton and Sierra Lundy. Jon Middleton is also the vocalist and guitarist in the band Jon and Roy They are most noted as Juno Award nominees for Breakthrough Group of the Year at the Juno Awards of 2022.

Middleton and Lundy began performing together as a duo in 2017, releasing a self-titled EP that year, and placed their song "Run to You" in a 2019 episode of Grey's Anatomy, and their song "The Less We Know" in a 2022  episode.

They released their debut album We Fall In in 2019, and followed up in 2020 with the EPs In That Room, and Tracks.

They released their fourth EP, Slow Tide, in 2021.

References

Canadian folk music groups
Canadian musical duos
Musical groups established in 2017
Musical groups from Victoria, British Columbia
2017 establishments in British Columbia